Prince Anthony Stanisław Albert Radziwiłł (August 4, 1959 – August 10, 1999) was a Swiss-born American television executive and filmmaker. He was a nephew of former First Lady Jacqueline Kennedy.

Early life and education
Born in Lausanne, Switzerland, Radziwiłł was the son of socialite/actress Lee Radziwiłł (younger sister of First Lady Jacqueline Bouvier Kennedy) and Stanisław Albrecht Radziwiłł. He married a former ABC colleague, Emmy Award-winning journalist Carole DiFalco, on 27 August 1994 on Long Island, New York.

Radziwiłł attended Millfield School and Choate Rosemary Hall preparatory school in Wallingford, Connecticut. In 1982, he finished his studies at Boston University, earning a bachelor's degree in broadcast journalism.

Career
Radziwiłł's career began at NBC Sports, as an associate producer. During the 1988 Winter Olympics in Calgary, Alberta, Canada, he contributed Emmy Award-winning work. In 1989, he joined ABC News as a television producer for Primetime Live. In 1990, he won the Peabody Award for an investigation on the resurgence of Nazism in the United States. Posthumously, Cancer: Evolution to Revolution was awarded a Peabody. His work was nominated for two Emmys.

Illness 
Around 1989 he was diagnosed with testicular cancer and underwent treatment which left him sterile but in apparent remission. However, shortly before his wedding, new tumors emerged. Radziwiłł battled metastasizing cancer throughout his five years of marriage, with his wife, Carole, serving as his primary caretaker through a succession of oncologists, hospitals, operations, and experimental treatments.

The couple lived in New York, and both Radziwiłł and Carole tried to maintain their careers as journalists between his bouts of hospitalization.

On September 21, 1996, Radziwiłł was the best man for the wedding of his best friend and cousin John F. Kennedy Jr. and Carolyn Bessette. Kennedy's older sister, Caroline, was the matron of honor.

Death
Radziwiłł died of cancer on August 10, 1999, three weeks after his cousin John Jr., his wife Carolyn Bessette, and her sister Lauren Bessette died in a plane crash. He was survived by his wife, his mother, and a sister, Tina.

Legacy
In 2000, his mother, Lee Radziwiłł, and widow, Carole Radziwiłł, set up a fund in his name to help emerging documentary filmmakers. In 2005, Carole wrote the autobiography What Remains: A Memoir of Fate, Friendship and Love, focused largely on her marriage to Radziwiłł. Published by Scribner, the book made The New York Times Best Seller List.

References

External links

1959 births
1999 deaths
Swiss emigrants to the United States
Choate Rosemary Hall alumni
Boston University College of Communication alumni
Anthony
Peabody Award winners
Bouvier family
American filmmakers
Deaths from cancer in New York (state)
Deaths from testicular cancer
American television producers
People from Lausanne
People educated at Millfield